Willy Bruno Ewald Schlokat (23 June 1898 – 14 September 1993) was a German track and field athlete. He competed in the javelin throw at the 1928 Summer Olympics and finished in fifth place with a result of 63.40 m, which was 1.20 m below his personal best.

References
 

1898 births
1993 deaths
German male javelin throwers
Olympic athletes of Germany
Athletes (track and field) at the 1928 Summer Olympics
People from Königsberg